There have been several dynasts of Russian Imperial House whose name is George:

 Grand Duke George Mikhailovich of Russia (1863-1919), grandson of Nicholas I and son of Grand duke Michael Nicolaievich of Russia.
 Grand Duke George Alexandrovich of Russia, younger brother of Nicholas II

Currently, also son of Maria Vladimirovna of Russia, uses the designation Grand Duke George Mikhailovitch of Russia.